Wilfrid James Mannion (16 May 1918 – 14 April 2000) was an English professional footballer who played as an inside forward, making over 350 senior appearances for Middlesbrough. He also played international football for England. With his blonde hair, he was nicknamed "The Golden Boy".

Early life
Mannion was born on 16 May 1918 in South Bank, the son of Irish immigrants Tommy and Mary Mannion, and one of ten children.

Club career

Middlesbrough
Mannion joined his local team Middlesbrough F.C. in 1936 and went on to make 341 Football League appearances for them, scoring on 99 occasions. He scored 110 goals in all competitions for Middlesbrough.

Mannion fought in France and Italy during World War II, and in Italy his commanding officer was the England cricketer Hedley Verity.

At the end of the 1947–48 season he wanted a transfer, but Middlesbrough refused. In protest he did not play for them for much of the following season but he eventually backed down and started playing for Middlesbrough again.

Later career
After initially retiring as a player in 1954, Mannion subsequently joined Hull City. However, the Football League suspended him for articles he had written, He then played non-league football with Poole Town and Cambridge United.

International career
Mannion was capped on 26 occasions by the England national team between 1946 and 1951, and his final appearance came on 3 October 1951. He was a member of the England squad for the 1950 FIFA World Cup. Along with Middlesbrough and England teammate George Hardwick, he was also part of the Great Britain football team that beat the Rest of Europe 6–1 in 1947.

He remains the only Middlesbrough player to score for England at the World Cup.

After football
Mannion was eventually awarded a testimonial match by Middlesbrough in 1983, alongside former Boro and England colleague George Hardwick.

Mannion died on 14 April 2000 at the age of 81. After his passing, Middlesbrough FC erected a statue of Mannion outside the Riverside Stadium.

In 2004 it was announced he was being inducted into the English Football Hall of Fame at the National Football Museum.

References

External links
 Profile at Spartacus Educational
 
 

1918 births
2000 deaths
Military personnel from Yorkshire
People from South Bank, Redcar and Cleveland
England international footballers
England wartime international footballers
English footballers
Association football inside forwards
1950 FIFA World Cup players
Hull City A.F.C. players
Middlesbrough F.C. players
Cambridge United F.C. players
Poole Town F.C. players
Earlestown F.C. players
English Football League players
British Army personnel of World War II
English Football Hall of Fame inductees
English Football League representative players
Green Howards soldiers